Filmow is a Brazil-based collaborative social network where users list the films and series they have watched or would like to watch, having the option of giving a review of up to 5 stars. The user shares its registered film library with friends. In addition, the site also has the basic functions of a social network where the user can meet new people and make new friends. It was founded by Alisson Patrício and Thais Lima, and it was launched on April 1, 2009.

Website 
Filmow allows all users, whether registered or not, to access any title information from the website database, making it a free for research, where anyone can seek information (cast, trailers, posters, reviews...), but only those who register the site can set up a profile and enjoy all the social functions. The site creates a detailed profile of each user's movie taste, gathering and displaying movies and favorite artists and also the movies the user have seen, want to see and doesn't want see. Furthermore, users can also share their opinions about the movies, series and novels through assessments on each title's own page. If a title is not found on the site, users can add their own.

History 
In 2008, Thais Lima met Skoob, a social network dedicated to literature, and then had the idea of a social network focused on movies. She showed her idea to her childhood friend Alisson Patrício, who readily approved the idea, and the two soon began working on the project. The project started very small, without foreign investment, and the work done in their spare time, with all the programming done by Alisson, but when the site began to grow they called their friend Wanderson Niquini to join the project with them and help in spreading the website. Rogério Bonfim joined Filmow in 2011 to bring Filmow to next level. They opened an office in São Paulo.

References

External links
 

Brazilian social networking websites
Social cataloging applications
Internet properties established in 2009